Nam Hyun-Hee (or  ; born 29 September 1981) is a South Korean foil fencer. She is left-handed.

She won the silver medal at the Beijing Olympics after losing 6-5 to Valentina Vezzali in the final.  She was also a team bronze medalist at the 2012 Summer Olympics, with South Korea beating France in the bronze medal match.  Her teammates were Jeon Hee-Sok, Jung Gil-Ok and Oh Ha-Na.

At the World Championship level, she was twice a world bronze medalist as an individual (2010 and 2011), she was part of the Korean team that won the team world championship in 2005.  Nam was also part of the Korean teams that won the bronze medal in the foil team event at the 2006 World Fencing Championships, after beating Poland in the bronze medal match with her teammates Jeon, Jung and Seo Mi-Jung, 2010 World Championships, beating Germany with teammates Jeon, Seo and Oh, and the 2011 World Championship, beating Poland again, this time with teammates Jeon, Jung and Lee Hye-Sun.

She was chosen to give the athlete's oath at the 2014 Asian Games.

She is married to cyclist Gong Hyo-suk.

Filmography

Television shows

References

1981 births
Living people
South Korean female foil fencers
Fencers at the 2004 Summer Olympics
Fencers at the 2008 Summer Olympics
Fencers at the 2012 Summer Olympics
Fencers at the 2016 Summer Olympics
Olympic fencers of South Korea
Olympic silver medalists for South Korea
Olympic bronze medalists for South Korea
Olympic medalists in fencing
Medalists at the 2012 Summer Olympics
Medalists at the 2008 Summer Olympics
Fencers at the 2002 Asian Games
Fencers at the 2006 Asian Games
Fencers at the 2010 Asian Games
Fencers at the 2014 Asian Games
Fencers at the 2018 Asian Games
Asian Games gold medalists for South Korea
Asian Games bronze medalists for South Korea
Asian Games medalists in fencing
Medalists at the 2002 Asian Games
Medalists at the 2006 Asian Games
Medalists at the 2010 Asian Games
Medalists at the 2014 Asian Games
Medalists at the 2018 Asian Games
Universiade medalists in fencing
Uiryeong Nam clan
Universiade gold medalists for South Korea
Left-handed fencers
People from Seongnam
Sportspeople from Gyeonggi Province
21st-century South Korean women